Mohammad Mahfud Mahmodin (born 13 May 1957), commonly known as Mahfud MD, is an Indonesian politician and lawyer, who is currently serving as the Coordinating Minister for Political, Legal, and Security Affairs of Indonesia. He is the first civilian to hold the office; with all of his predecessors coming from military – mostly Army – retirees. He also previously served as the chief justice of the Constitutional Court of Indonesia, member of the People's Representative Council, Minister of Defense, and Minister of Law and Human Rights.

Born in Sampang, on 13 May 1957, he is of Madurese descent. He holds a master's degree in political science and a doctorate in constitutional law (1993) from Gadjah Mada University in Yogyakarta. He taught constitutional law at the faculty of law at the Islamic University of Indonesia (UII) in Yogyakarta, though he has also taught in a number of other universities in Indonesia. In 2000, he was appointed as Minister of Defense by president Abdurrahman Wahid, before being briefly appointed to the office of Minister of Law and Human Rights for three days. In 2004, he was elected to the People's Representative Council (DPR), as a member of the National Awakening Party.

In 2008, he was selected as a judge of the Constitutional Court. In the election for chief justice, he narrowly defeated the incumbent Jimly Asshiddiqie to become the second chief justice of the court. He resigned from the DPR upon taking the position, serving until his term ended in April 2013. The end of Mahfud's time as chief justice was subsequently followed by intention to run for the presidential seat in 2014, which was eventually won by former Jakarta governor, Joko Widodo.

In 2019, he was rumored to be Joko Widodo's running mate in 2019. As vice president Jusuf Kalla was not eligible to serve for another term, due to term limits, as Jusuf Kalla had already served another five-year term as vice-president under Susilo Bambang Yudhoyono from 2004 to 2009. Though he was passed up for the position, which instead went to Ma'ruf Amin. In 2019, following Joko Widodo's re-election, he was appointed the Coordinating Minister for Political, Legal, and Security Affairs.

Names and initials

Names 
Mahfud MD was known by a number of different names throughout his life.

 Mahfud MD, is his most popular and well known name.
 Mohammad Mahfud MD, is his full name.
 Mohammad Mahfud, was his birth name.

Initials 
The initials MD, behind his name is an abbreviation of his father's name, Mahmodin. The additional name began when he studied at the Religious Teacher Education (PGA), an educational institution equivalent to a junior high school, where in one class there were several students by the name of Mahfud. To distinguish him, the teacher asked all students named Mahfud to put their parents' names behind each of their names. With Mahfud MD using the initials of his father. Accidentally, the name was written in his diploma.

Early life, family, and Education

Childhood and family 
Mohammad Mahfud MD, originally born only as Mohammad Mahfud, was born on 13 May 1957, in the a village in Omben District, Sampang, Madura. He is the fourth child of seven children. His father was Mahmodin, an employee at the Omben District office, Sampang Regency. While his mother was a housewife named Siti Khadidjah. When Mahfud was two months old, his family moved to Pamekasan, where Mahfud would spend most of his childhood.

Education

Early education 
When he was seven years old, he was sent to SD Negeri Waru Pamekasan, a public elementary school. While in the afternoon, he studied at the Madrasah Ibtida'iyyah, at the Al Mardhiyyah Islamic Boarding School. Mahfud was then sent to the Somber Lagah Islamic Boarding School in Tegangser Laok Village, now known as Pondok Pesantren al-Mardhiyyah, a salafi Islamic boarding school that is managed by Kyai Mardhiyyan. His parents enrolled him in the Pamekasan High School.

University 
Mahfud was selected to continue his education to the Religious Teacher Education (PHIN), a leading vocational school belonging to the Ministry of Religion in Yogyakarta. In 1978, Mahfud graduated from PHIN. He then continued his education at the Faculty of Law, the Islamic University of Indonesia (UII). At the same time, he also studied Arabic Literature at the University of Gadjah Mada (UGM). At the Faculty of Law of the university, Mahfud majored in Constitutional Law. In fact, at the time his father had retire. To finance himself, Mahfud actively write in public newspapers such as the Kedaulatan Rakyat in order to get an honorarium. Mahfud won the UII Chancellor's scholarship, the Dharma Siswa Madura Foundation scholarship, and the Supersemar Foundation scholarship.

He graduated from the UII in 1983, becoming a lecturer. He later continued his postgraduate studies in political science, and graduating in 1989. He also graduated from UGM in 1993 with a law degree. His dissertation describes the causal relationship between political configuration and legal products in various periods, namely the period of Liberal Democracy, Guided Democracy, and the New Order.

Academic career
After graduating, he worked as a lecturer in a number of universities, including his alma mater UII, IAIN Sunan Kalijaga, and STIE Widya Wiwaha, Yogyakarta, and became a civil servant. He also held the academic position of Vice Chancellor of UII, from 1994 to 2000, Director/Professor of the Faculty of Law of UII, from 1996 to 2000, and Chancellor of the Kadiri Islamic University, from 2003 until 2006.

Political career

Early political career

Cabinet minister
Mahfud was appointed as Minister of Defense by President Abdurrahman Wahid on 23 August 2000. The appointment of Mahfud as the Minister of Defense caused controversy, after being rumored that the appointment was disagreed by vice president Megawati Sukarnoputri, although Mahfud later admitted that he met Megawati in personal, and confirmed that she didn't have any problems with his appointment. Following a cabinet reshuffle on 20 July 2001, Mahfud moved from the defense portfolio and was appointed Minister of Law and Human Rights. He held office briefly until Wahid's impeachment by the People's Consultative Assembly a few days later and the Mutual Assistance Cabinet's formation.

People's Representative Council

In 2004, Mahfud ran as a candidate for a seat in the People's Representative Council (DPR), as a member of the National Awakening Party. He ran in the East Java X electoral district, which includes the Lamongan and Gresik regencies. He was elected to the seat in the election. In the people's Representative Council, he served in the Third Commission of the People's Representative Council. In addition to the commission, Mahfud also served as Deputy Chairman of the Legislative Body of the DPR.

Constitutional Court Judge

Appointment 
In 2008, Mahfud was elected as a judge of the Constitutional Court, after pocketing 38 votes for members of the Third Commission in the open election. In the election for chief justice, he narrowly defeated the incumbent Jimly Asshiddiqie to become the second chief justice of the court. He resigned from parliament upon taking the position, serving until his term ended in April 2013.

Tenure 
Mahfud attracted considerable publicity during his period at the court. The court is regarded as having made some progressive decisions and transformed the Constitutional Court being free of corruption during his time as chief justice but has also issued some surprising decisions such as an unexpected ruling in late 2012 that the existence of the upstream oil and gas regulatory agency BPMigas was unconstitutional.

2014 Presidential election
Towards the end of 2012 there was increased speculation about the possibility that Mahfud would become a candidate in the 2014 presidential elections in Indonesia. Several polls indicated high support for Mahfud amongst some groups of voters. In November 2012 he stood for, and was elected to, the position of chair of the Islamic Students Alumni Association (KAHMI), an influential Muslim organisation. His decision to successfully seek election as the chair of KAHMI, and being selected ahead of other well-known politicians such as Anas Urbaningrum, was seen as boosting his credibility as a potential presidential candidate.

He was the biggest candidate for vice president on 2019 partnering Joko Widodo, but the decision was cancelled in the last minute.

Coordinating Minister

In October 2019, Mahfud was appointed Coordinating Minister for Political, Legal and Security Affairs of Indonesia in Onward Indonesia Cabinet. He is the first civilian to hold the position, as his predecessors were all from Army or police. He was criticized during the return of Habib Rizieq, leader of the Islamic Defenders Front (FPI), from Saudi that he permitted a mass gathering to welcome Rizieq in airport amid pandemic which eventually leading to criminal prosecutions and deaths of 6 FPI members who were extrajudicially murdered by the police in December 2020.

He often comments on issues concerning human rights in Indonesia.  His comments, for example about the rights of atheists and communists under Indonesian law caused a fuss in mid-2012 when he said people could only be punished for being atheists or communists if they behaved in a way that breached the national ideology of Pancasila.  More recently, in September 2012 he was critical of a proposal from the National Counterterrorist Agency to certify Islamic clerics and scholars as a way of minimising the risk of radicalism.

Kanjuruhan Stadium disaster

On 3 October 2022, Mahmud appointed by Joko Widodo to led TGIPF (Tim Gabungan Independen Pencari Fakta; Joint Independent Fact Finding Team). The team was tasked to revealed facts of Kanjuruhan disaster that occurred on 1 October 2022. He was teamed with Zainudin Amali of Minister of Youth and Sport, Nur Rochmad, Rhenald Kasali of University of Indonesia academics, Sumaryanto of Yogyakarta State University rector, Akmal Marhali of Save Our Soccer coordinator, Anton Sanjoy of Kompas journalist, Nugroho Setiawan of AFC security officer, Doni Monardo of former BNPB chief, Suwarno of vice-chairman of KONI, Sri Handayani of former deputy regional police chief of West Borneo, Laode M. Syarif of former vice chief of KPK, and Kurniawan Dwi Yulianto of former Indonesian footballer. On 14 October, TGIPF assessed that there were 8 PSSI "sins" after the Kanjuruhan Tragedy and PSSI Chairman (Mochamad Iriawan) and executive committee members should resign.

Views on the Indonesian LGBT community 
In his role as Coordinating Minister of Political, Legal and Security Affairs, Mahfud is explicitly homophobic, having called on lawmakers to pass amendments to the KUHP (Criminal Code) criminalizing several actions taken by consenting queer adults. He has accused the Indonesian LGBT community of being a front for international organizations; however, he failed to tender evidence in favour of his allegations. He has publicly referred to LGBT Indonesians as demons that must be exterminated.

Mahfud has broadly characterized LGBT people as being unconstitutional, a type of conduct which has been condemned by Komnas HAM (the Indonesian National Human Rights Commission) as being contrary to Section 28(g)(1) and Section 28(l)(2) of the actual Constitution of Indonesia. His conduct has also attracted condemnation from Nong Darol Mahmada, a member of the Liberal Islam Network. On 12 May 2022, in response to public controversy related to Deddy Corbuzier hosting a gay couple on his talk show, Mahfud stated on Twitter that: while there currently exists no law criminalizing LGBT Indonesians (other than those that fell under pre-existing grounds of sexual offences, such as statutory rape, his view was that the KUHP (Criminal Code) should swiftly be amended by Parliament to outlaw non-heterosexual intimate relations entirely.

Awards 
 At the first edition of Seputar Indonesia Awards by RCTI, in 2011, Mahfud MD was named as the newsmaker of the year, beating US President Barack Obama and World Bank managing director Sri Mulyani Indrawati.

Personal life 
Mahfud is married to Zaizatun Nihayati, a lawyer and teacher, born on 18 November 1959, in Jember, the second of eight children of the couple Sya'roni and Shofiyah, who studied at the Faculty of Law, of the Islamic University of Indonesia, Yogyakarta. They first met on the campus of the Islamic University of Indonesia in 1978, when both were active in the Muslim Student's Association (HMI).They officially married on 2 October 1982, in Semboro, Jember. Together, they had three children:

 Mohammad Ikhwan Zein (born March 15, 1984)
 Vina Amalia (born July 15, 1989)
 Royhan Akbar (born February 7, 1991)

References

External links
 Mohammad Mahfud MD Ketua Mahkamah Kosntitusi 2008-2011

|-

|-

|-

|-

|-

|-

Living people
1957 births
21st-century Indonesian judges
Members of the People's Representative Council, 2009
National Awakening Party politicians
Indonesian Muslims
People from Sampang Regency
Gadjah Mada University alumni
Defense ministers of Indonesia
Government ministers of Indonesia
Onward Indonesia Cabinet